The 2013–14 George Washington Colonials men's basketball team represented George Washington University during the 2013–14 NCAA Division I men's basketball season. The Colonials, led by third year head coach Mike Lonergan, played their home games at the Charles E. Smith Athletic Center and were members of the Atlantic 10 Conference. They finished the season 24–9, 11–5 in A-10 play to finish in a tie for third place. They advanced to the semifinals of the A-10 tournament where they lost to VCU. They received an at-large bid to the NCAA tournament where they lost in the second round to Memphis.

Roster

Schedule

|-
!colspan=9 style="background:#00285C; color:#EECFA1;"| Exhibition

|-
!colspan=9 style="background:#00285C; color:#EECFA1;"| Regular season

|-
!colspan=9 style="background:#00285C; color:#EECFA1;"| Atlantic 10 tournament

|-
!colspan=9 style="background:#00285C; color:#EECFA1;"| NCAA tournament

References

George Washington Colonials men's basketball seasons
George Washington
George Washington